The canton of Antibes-Centre is a former administrative division in southeastern France. It was disbanded following the French canton reorganisation which came into effect in March 2015. It had 28,964 inhabitants (2012). It comprised part of the commune of Antibes.

Demographics

See also
Cantons of the Alpes-Maritimes department

References

Former cantons of Alpes-Maritimes
Canton Anitbes Centre
2015 disestablishments in France
States and territories disestablished in 2015